Sanchi (Dargwa: Санджи) is a rural locality (a selo) in Kaytagsky District, Republic of Dagestan, Russia. The population was 1,798 as of 2010. There are 7 streets.

Geography 
Sanchi is located on the left bank of the Ulluchay River. It is located 2 km northwest of Madzhalis (the district's administrative centre) by road. Madzhalis and Akhmedkent are the nearest rural localities.

Nationalities 
Dargins live there.

References 

Rural localities in Kaytagsky District